The 2020–21 McNeese State Cowboys basketball team represented McNeese State University in the 2020–21 NCAA Division I men's basketball season. The Cowboys, led by third-year head coach Heath Schroyer, played their home games at Burton Coliseum, due to hurricane damage at the HH&P Complex, in Lake Charles, Louisiana as members of the Southland Conference.

Previous season
The Cowboys finished the 2019–20 season 15–17, 10–10 in Southland play to finish in a three-way tie for sixth place. They lost in the first round of the Southland tournament to Lamar.

Roster

Schedule and results

|-
!colspan=12 style=| Non-conference regular season

|-
!colspan=12 style=| Southland regular season

|-
!colspan=12 style=| Southland tournament

Source

References

McNeese Cowboys basketball seasons
McNeese State Cowboys
McNeese State Cowboys basketball
McNeese State Cowboys basketball